Events in the year 1780 in India.

Events
National income - ₹9,900 million
 2nd Mysore War.

Law
East India Company Act (British statute)

References

 
India
Years of the 18th century in India